Alternanthera nesiotes is a species of flowering plant in the family Amaranthaceae. It is endemic to the Galápagos Islands, where it is limited to Floreana Island. There are five subpopulations which are susceptible to habitat degradation due to invasive species of plants and animals.

References

Flora of the Galápagos Islands
nesiotes
Endangered plants
Taxonomy articles created by Polbot